Stigmella poterii is a moth of the family Nepticulidae. It is found from Fennoscandia to the Pyrenees and Italy, and from Ireland to Ukraine.

The wingspan is .The thick erect hairs on the head vertex are ferruginous and the collar dark brown Antennal eyecaps are whitish. Forewings are golden-bronze; a pale golden metallic slightly inwards-oblique fascia beyond middle : apical area beyond this dark purple-fuscous. Hindwings are grey.

Adults fly in June, then a second generation in August and September.

The larva is amber yellow in colour and has a brown-coloured head. It feeds on Filipendula ulmaria, Potentilla anserina, Potentilla erecta, Potentilla palustris, Potentilla tabernaemontani, Rubus arcticus, Rubus chamaemorus, Rubus saxatilis, Sanguisorba minor and Sanguisorba officinalis. They mine the leaves of their host plant. The mine consists of a short corridor. The first part is narrow and tends to follow a vein. The second part is considerably widened and often forms a secondary blotch.

References

External links
Bestimmungshilfe für die in Europa nachgewiesenen Schmetterlingsarten
Swedish moths
Stigmella poterii images at  Consortium for the Barcode of Life
 

Nepticulidae
Moths described in 1857
Moths of Europe